These are the Billboard R&B singles chart number-one songs of 2007.

Chart history

See also
2007 in music
List of number-one R&B hits (United States)

References

2007
United States RandB
2007 in American music